Shakira Martin may refer to:

Shakira Martin (model) (1986–2016), Jamaican model
Shakira Martin (NUS president) (born 1988), British student politician